Holzape is a river of Hesse, Germany. It flows into the Diemel in Trendelburg-Wülmersen.

See also
List of rivers of Hesse

References

Rivers of Hesse
Reinhardswald
Rivers of Germany